Eloy Gutiérrez Menoyo (December 8, 1934 – October 26, 2012) was a revolutionary who led the guerrilla force Second National Front of Escambray during the Cuban Revolution against Fulgencio Batista and later opposed the government of Fidel Castro over its pro-Soviet leanings. His brother Carlos Gutíerrez Menoyo died in the Presidential Palace attack of March 13, 1957.

Life
 
Gutiérrez Menoyo came from a Spanish family active in the Spanish Civil War and emigrated to Cuba following the victory of Francisco Franco′s forces with his family in 1945.

In Cuba in 1957, Eloy formed and commanded the rebel group Second National Front of Escambray, which fought against president Batista′s dictatorial rule alongside Fidel Castro′s 26 July Revolutionary Movement and the 13th of March Revolutionary Student Directorate. In March 1957, he and his brother, Carlos, were part of an attack on the Presidential Palace of Fulgencio Batista; his brother, Carlos, was killed in that attack. On January 3 of 1959, Eloy and his troops entered the City of Havana, Cuba and few days before Fidel Castro did and Eloy was hailed as one of the Commanders Of The Revolution. Eloy's own army was absorbed into the army of Fidel Castro but Eloy was permitted to retain the rank of 'Major' which was the highest rank in Cuba at the time. However, Eloy and many of his senior officers were never offered a post in the Castro administration. While being on the outside and looking in, Eloy grew dissatisfied with the Castro administration and in September–October 1959, Eloy and some of his men from the old 1st Version of the Second National Front - which was formed in 1957 as a pro-Castro group - formed the 2nd Version of the Second National Front - which was an anti-Castro group.

However, in January 1961, events took a turn against these anti-Castro 2nd Version members and Eloy and about 12 military and civilian supporters fled to the US on a boat. Eloy settled in Miami, Florida. While in Florida, Eloy helped form Alpha 66. Formed in January–February 1962, Alpha 66 was created too late to take part in April 1961 Bay of Pigs Invasion.

However, after the assassination of John F. Kennedy in 1963, Eloy led an armed incursion into Cuba in December 1964, but was captured, jailed, and abused, on one occasion being beaten nearly to death by guards. After 22 years in prison, Eloy was freed in 1986 after a petition by the Spanish government. Eloy then went into exile in Spain. Eloy then returned to Miami, Florida where he formed Cambio Cubano or Cuban Change in 1992.

In 2003, Eloy left the USA and returned to Cuba where he would remain for the rest of his life as a "tolerated dissident".

In 2021, an FBI memo confirmed that Menoyo was an asset of US Army intelligence.

Eloy had at least three wives. He had a daughter in Puerto Rico with his 1st wife; his 2nd wife, Gladys, remained in Florida with their three sons. His 3rd wife was Flor Ester Torres Sanabria.

See also
 Faure Chomón
 Augusto Martínez Sánchez
 José Antonio Echeverría
 Rolando Cubela Secades

References

Name pronunciation

1934 births
2012 deaths
People from Madrid
Cuban dissidents
Cuban Revolution
Opposition to Fidel Castro
People of the Cuban Revolution
Exiles of the Cuban Revolution in the United States
Spanish emigrants to Cuba